Thirumalai is a 2003 Indian Tamil-language masala film written and directed by Ramana. The film stars Vijay and Jyothika, with Manoj K. Jayan, Avinash (in his Tamil debut), Vivek, Raghuvaran, Kausalya and Karunas in supporting roles. Produced by Kavithalayaa Productions banner, Thirumalai shows Vijay playing a bike mechanic of the Pudupet area in Chennai. This film was a turning point in Vijay's career as he transitioned himself into a leading action hero from a romantic hero in his acting career.

Filming began in May 2002 and was planned for a 2002 Christmas release, along with the Suriya starrer, Mounam Pesiyadhe but the delays due to the replacement of heroine and villain caused it to release October 2003, on the occasion of Diwali. The film was declared as a blockbuster at the box office alongside positive reviews from critics and audiences, despite its delays.

The film was remade in Telugu as Gowri with Sumanth and Charmme Kaur in  2004. It was also remade in Bengali Bangladesh in 2007 as Kotha Dao Sathi Hobe starring Shakib Khan and Apu Biswas.

Plot 
Thirumalai, a mechanic, falls in love with Swetha. However, Swetha's father, Ashok, the owner of a TV channel, is unhappy with their relationship. He asks Arasu, a gangster's to help create fights between the couple.

Cast

Production 
The filming began in May 2002, when Vijay was simultaneously shooting for his previous action flick, Bagavathi (2002). Directing the film was debutant Ramana who had apprenticed with director R. K. Selvamani. The shooting finally ended in November 2002. On 15 January 2003, Vijay stated that he had started dubbing for his portions of the film. Vijay also sported a new look, which he maintained for his subsequent films until Puli (2015). It was actually director Ramana, who suggested Vijay that he maintain a new look in the film, with his mustache trimmed and growing a beard. Vijay was initially hesitant to do so, but upon seeing the screen test, he was impressed with his new getup and the rest is history.

Namrata Shirodkar was chosen initially to play the female lead. But the director was not satisfied with her onscreen presence and she was replaced by Jyothika. This is her second film with Vijay after Kushi (2000).

A set resembling a market place with a mechanic shop in it was erected at Mohan Studios at a cost of about {{INR}} 50 lakh. Designed by art director Kathir, shooting took place there for 30 days. The film's shooting occurred in Chennai, Nellore and Vishakhapatnam, while the songs were filmed overseas.

Music 

Music was composed by Vidyasagar. The audio's album consisting of five songs, was released on 6 December 2002. The audio was also well received among the audience.

Release 
The film was released on 24 October 2003 worldwide, on the occasion of Diwali, and was commercially successful.

Reception 
Ananda Vikatan rated the film 39 out of 100. Nowrunning gave the film 3 out of 5 stars and stated "Yet another poor-boy rich-girl romance with parental opposition and mafia interference". Chennai Online wrote "There's nothing fresh here that we haven't seen in an earlier Vijay film. The Vijay-Jyotika pair, after their successful combination in Kushi, was expected to re-create the same magic on screen. But it doesn't happen". Thiraipadam wrote "Thirumalai sees director Ramana working within two big limitations. He has an age-old poor boy-rich girl love story in hand and has to contend with Vijay's mass image. Considering these restrictions, he has done a commendable job. By fashioning the hero's character a little differently and designing a fast screenplay that contains several stock situations but resolves them differently, he overcomes those negatives to deliver an entertaining feature". Behindwoods wrote " Things were never going easy for Vijay until Thirumalai happened and resurrected his image as a mass hero that he’s become today. The film was a well executed commercial potboiler which showcased Vijay excelling at all aspects of his role."

References

External links 
 

2000s Tamil-language films
2003 directorial debut films
2003 films
Films scored by Vidyasagar
Films set in Chennai
Films shot in Chennai
Films shot in Egypt
Films shot in Switzerland
Films shot in Visakhapatnam
Indian romantic action films
2000s romantic action films
Tamil films remade in other languages